Bridger is a census-designated place (CDP) in Gallatin County, Montana, United States. It comprises the Bridger Bowl Ski Area and some nearby residences on the eastern side of the Bridger Range in southwestern Montana. As of the 2010 census the Bridger CDP had a population of 30.

Montana Highway 86 forms the eastern edge of the CDP, leading north and east  to Wilsall and south and west  to Bozeman. Bridger Creek, a tributary of the Gallatin River, flows southwards through the eastern part of the CDP.

Demographics

References

Census-designated places in Gallatin County, Montana
Census-designated places in Montana